FC Rosengård, formerly Malmö FF Dam (1970–2007) and LdB FC Malmö (2007–2013), is a professional football club based in Malmö, Scania, Sweden. The team was established as Malmö FF Dam in 1970. It started out with playing 7 seasons in the Division 1 (until 1987), but has played in Damallsvenskan in since it formed in 1988. The team has won the league a record thirteen times, the latest in 2022.  As of the end of the 2015 season, the club ranks first in the overall Damallsvenskan table. FC Rosengård play their home games at Malmö IP in Malmö. The club it merged with, FC Rosengård 1917, has both men's and women's teams.

History
On 7 September 1970 the board of Malmö FF took the decision to start a women's team as part of the main club. The team was called Malmö FF Dam – the word dam meaning lady – to distinguish the team from the men's division of the same club.

In 1986 the club won the Swedish Women's Football Division 1 for the first time. The Division 1 was Sweden's highest division until 1988 when the Damallsvenskan was formed. It took three seasons for the club to win the newly formed Damallsvenskan in 1990 and more success followed in 1991, 1993 and 1994. Malmö FF Dam would then finish as runners-up for seven consecutive seasons (from 1996 to 2002).

In April 2007, Malmö FF Dam started a rebranding of the team, including a new team name, jerseys, and logo. The team was renamed LdB FC Malmö on 11 April 2007. This meant that the club fully withdrew from Malmö FF and became a club of its own. The change of name was related to a 24 million SEK sponsorship deal with Swedish skincare firm Hardford; whose leading brand Lait de Beauté (lit. beauty milk) became the name of the club.

Under the LdB FC Malmö name, the club won the Damallsvenskan championship in 2010, which qualified them for the 2011–12 UEFA Women's Champions League. A successful title defense campaign followed in the 2011 season. In the final match of the 2012 season they suffered a home defeat (0–1) to Tyresö FF, the result meant Tyresö FF were champions due to better goal difference. In 2013, they clinched the title once again, with a (2–3) win away against Tyresö FF being the turning point of the season.

In October 2013, LdB FC Malmö merged with FC Rosengård 1917, adopting the name of the latter. The Damallsvenskan title wins of 2014 and 2015 added to the 2013 title (as LdB FC Malmö), made the club three times in a row title winners for the first time in its history.

Squad

Former players
For details of current and former players, see :Category:FC Rosengård players.

Achievements
Note: Achievements of Malmö FF Dam, LdB FC Malmö and FC Rosengård are all counted here

Domestic

League
 Damallsvenskan (Tier 1)
 Winners (13): 1986, 1990, 1991, 1993, 1994, 2010, 2011, 2013, 2014, 2015, 2019, 2021, 2022
 Runners-up (13): 1989, 1996, 1997, 1998, 1999, 2000, 2001, 2002, 2005, 2012, 2016, 2017, 2020
 Division 1 Södra (Tier 1)
 Winners (1): 1986
 Division 2 Södra Götaland (Tier 2)
 Winners (1): 1980

Cups
 Svenska Cupen:
 Winners (5): 1990, 1997, 2015–16, 2016–17, 2017–18, 2021-22
 Runners-up (2): 2003, 2014–15
Svenska Supercupen:
 Winners (4): 2011, 2012, 2015, 2016

Record in UEFA competitions
All results (away, home and aggregate) list Rosengård Malmö's goal tally first.

f First leg.

Footnotes

External links

  

 
Women's football clubs in Sweden
Sport in Malmö
Malmö FF
1970 establishments in Sweden
Damallsvenskan teams
Association football clubs established in 1970